Morris Winchevsky (Yiddish: מאָריס װינטשעװסקי; born as Leopold Benzion Novokhovitch; August 9 1856–March 18 1932), also known as Ben Netz, was a prominent Jewish socialist leader in London and the United States in the late 19th century.

Born in Jonava, Lithuania, in 1856, Winchevsky later moved to London where, already a well known socialist, he founded the Der Poylisher Yidl (The Little Polish Jew), one of the first Yiddish daily socialist newspapers; and the Arbeter Fraynd, the first Yiddish-language anarchist newspaper.

In the US
After immigrating to New York City, Winchevsky joined with Abraham Cahan and Louis Miller, two other prominent New York Jewish socialists, to found what would later become the largest Yiddish-language daily newspaper in the world, The Forward in 1897. This got them kicked out of the Socialist Labor Party. They would later migrate to the Social Democracy of America, the Social Democratic Party of America and the Socialist Party of America. Winchevsky wrote parodies directed to Jews of the Pale of Settlement in hopes of creating class consciousness.

Winchevsky was later selected as the representative of the Jewish Socialist Federation to the American Jewish Congress when the AJC met to select its delegates to the Paris Peace Conference in 1919. At the meeting of the Congress, Winchevsky was publicly censured by the JSF for expressing Zionist sentiments.

He was subsequently associated with the Communist Party USA and its Yiddish daily Morgen Freiheit.

Winchevsky died on March 18, 1932, and is buried in the Workmen's Circle section of Mount Carmel Cemetery, alongside other Jewish socialist leaders.

Poetry
Winchevsky is known for his role in the development of Yiddish poetry. Notably, he was a member of the Proletarian Poets, an association formed with Winchevsky, Morris Rosenfeld, David Edelstadt, and Joseph Bovshover.

Tributes
A "secular humanist" Jewish Sunday school in Toronto, Ontario, was named after Winchevsky. Founded in 1928, the Morris Winchevsky School is run by the United Jewish People's Order.

References

Further reading
 Melech Epstein, Profiles of Eleven. Detroit, MI: Wayne State University Press, 1965.
 Irving Howe, World of Our Fathers: The Journey of the East European Jews to America and the Life They Found and Made. New York: Harcourt Brace Jovanovich, 1976.

External links

1856 births
1932 deaths
People from Jonava
People from Kovensky Uyezd
Lithuanian Jews
Emigrants from the Russian Empire to the United States
American people of Lithuanian-Jewish descent
Members of the Socialist Labor Party of America
Social Democratic Party of America politicians
Members of the Socialist Party of America
American Marxists
Jewish American writers
Jewish socialists
Yiddish-language satirists

lt:Moris Winczewski
pl:Moris Winczewski